Althengstett is a municipality in the district of Calw in Baden-Württemberg in Germany.

History
Althengstett was first mentioned in a document from around 1120 regarding a donation to Hirsau Abbey as "Hingesteten". The village was purchased in 1301 by Herrenalb Abbey and, some time from 1338 to 1341, the County of Württemberg was named protector of the town.

Geography
The municipality (Gemeinde) of Simmozheim is located in the district of Calw, in Baden-Württemberg, one of the 16 States of the Federal Republic of Germany. At the southwestern edge of the municipal area is the source of the Tälesbach, a tributary of the Nagold. Elevation above sea level in the municipal area ranges from a high of  Normalnull (NN) to a low of  NN.

A portion of the Federally protected  nature reserve is located in Althengstett's municipal area.

Politics
Althengstett has three boroughs, Althengstett, Neuhengstett, and Ottenbronn, and the industrial district of Unterer Wald. The abandoned villages of Schlehdorn and Schweichingen are also found in the municipal area.

Coat of arms
Althengstett's coat of arms displays a white stallion standing and facing left upon green ground upon a field of blue. It was however not until 1952 that its tincture was decided and it was adopted by the municipal council. The coat of arms were retained after the 1974 merger and it was approved for municipal use by the Calw district office on 8 June 1982. A corresponding municipal flag was also issued on that date.

Transportation

References

External links

  (in German)

Calw (district)
Württemberg